This is a list of singles that have peaked in the top 10 of the French Singles Chart in 2013.

Top 10 singles

2012 peaks

Notes
  - The single re-entered the Top 10 on the week ending 27 January 2013.
  - The single re-entered the Top 10 on the week ending 17 February 2013.
  - The single re-entered the Top 10 on the week ending 3 March 2013.
  - The single re-entered the Top 10 on the week ending 10 March 2013.
  - The single re-entered the Top 10 on the week ending 21 April 2013.
  - The single re-entered the Top 10 on the week ending 28 April 2013.
  - The single re-entered the Top 10 on the week ending 12 May 2013.
  - The single re-entered the Top 10 on the week ending 19 May 2013.
  - The single re-entered the Top 10 on the week ending 26 May 2013.
  - The single re-entered the Top 10 on the week ending 30 June 2013.
  - The single re-entered the Top 10 on the week ending 11 August 2013.
  - The single re-entered the Top 10 on the week ending 25 August 2013.
  - The single re-entered the Top 10 on the week ending 8 September 2013.
  - The single re-entered the Top 10 on the week ending 15 September 2013.
  - The single re-entered the Top 10 on the week ending 13 October 2013.
  - The single re-entered the Top 10 on the week ending 20 October 2013.
  - The single re-entered the Top 10 on the week ending 27 October 2013.
  - The single re-entered the Top 10 on the week ending 10 November 2013.
  - The single re-entered the Top 10 on the week ending 1 December 2013.
  - The single re-entered the Top 10 on the week ending 8 December 2013.
  - The single re-entered the Top 10 on the week ending 15 December 2013.
  - The single re-entered the Top 10 on the week ending 22 December 2013.
  - The single re-entered the Top 10 on the week ending 29 December 2013.

See also
2013 in music
List of number-one hits of 2013 (France)

References

External links 
 LesCharts.com

Top
France
Top 10 singles in 2013
France 2013